Susanna Griso Raventós (born 8 October 1969) is a Spanish journalist and television presenter.

Biography
Susanna Griso was born into a large family in Barcelona. Her father is an industrialist of the textile sector and her mother is descended from the family that owns the Codorníu Winery.

With a degree in journalism from the Autonomous University of Barcelona (UAB), she began her professional career at Ràdio Sant Cugat and Catalunya Ràdio. In 1993 she presented the TV3 talk shows Tres senyores i un senyor and Fóra de joc. In 1995 she presented the news program  and the special Resum de l'any.

In 1998 she started working on Antena 3, joining the show Noticias 1 with Matías Prats, and since December 2006 she has presented the current events program .

In 2010 she contributed to the photographic exhibition Mujeres al natural, in support of cancer research. In January 2011 she presented a special program about Queen Sofía in connection with the miniseries that Antena 3 broadcast that year. In January 2014, she presented several special programs on The Time in Between, a format that consisted of commenting on the current events of the time and that was broadcast just after each chapter of the series.

Television career
 1993: Tres senyores i un senyor, on TV3
 1993: Fóra de joc., on TV3
 1995: , en TV3
 1998–2006: Antena 3 Noticias, on Antena 3 (presenter)
 2006–present: , on Antena 3 (presenter)
 2014: Especial: El tiempo entre costuras, on Antena 3 (presenter)
 2016: , on Antena 3 (presenter)

Appearances on TV series
 Aquí no hay quien viva (2003) – 1 episode
  (2003) – 1 episode
 Un paso adelante (2005) – 1 episode
 Los hombres de Paco (2005) – 1 episode
 Física o Química (2011) – 1 episode
  (2013) – 1 episode
 Money Heist (2017) – 1 episode

Awards and nominations

References

External links
 
 

1969 births
Autonomous University of Barcelona alumni
Journalists from Catalonia
Living people
Spanish television journalists
Spanish television presenters
Spanish women journalists
Writers from Barcelona
Women television journalists
Spanish women television presenters